Shane Tuck (24 December 198120 July 2020) was an Australian rules footballer who played 173 matches for the Richmond Football Club in the Australian Football League (AFL) after also spending two years on the AFL list at Hawthorn without making an AFL appearance. Tuck was a life member at Richmond and placed in the top 10 of the club's "best and fairest" award in seven of his ten seasons at Richmond. His father is seven-time Hawthorn premiership player Michael Tuck.

Early life and junior football
Tuck played junior football at Beaconsfield in the suburbs of Melbourne, and played representative football with the Dandenong Stingrays in the TAC Cup. In his draft-age year in 1999, Tuck also played with the  reserves side in the AFL reserves competition.

Playing career

Hawthorn (2000–2001)
He spent two seasons at Hawthorn without earning an AFL debut, instead playing reserves grade football with the club's VFL affiliate, the Box Hill Hawks. At the end of the 2001 AFL season, Tuck was delisted by Hawthorn.

Local and state-league football (2002–2003)
Tuck played local football in the Mornington Peninsula League in 2002, before moving to South Australia to play with West Adelaide in the SANFL in 2003, where he began attracting the attention of AFL scouts.

Richmond (2004–2013)
After spending much of the year playing reserves football with the club's VFL-affiliate , Tuck made his AFL debut in Round 14 of the 2004 AFL season.

In 2005, Tuck had a stellar season and played all 22 games Richmond were involved in. He finished third in the club's best and fairest award that year.

Tuck placed 10th in the club's best and fairest in 2006, third in 2007, and second in 2008. Tuck missed playing in Round 17, 2009, ending a 104-game streak of consecutive games since playing in Round 1, 2005. He placed seventh in the club's best and fairest in 2009.

In Round 6 2010, Tuck collected a career-best 28 disposals in a match against . A month later he set a new club record with 14 tackles in a match against  in Round 10. That year he placed fifth in the club's best and fairest count.

After the 2011 season, Tuck informed the club of his decision to retire, but he was talked into recommitting to the club for at least one further season.

In Round 12 in 2012, he collected a club record 23 contested possessions, a feat which he equalled six weeks later in Round 18. In 2012, Tuck placed fourth in the club's best and fairest count. He set new records that year for the most contested possessions (298) and most tackles (124) in a single season by any Richmond player in the club's history. Both records stood for five years until broken by former teammates Dustin Martin and Trent Cotchin, respectively, in 2017. At the end of the year, he was awarded life membership at Richmond.

Tuck suffered a fractured scapula in May 2013 that saw him miss two months of football. Following four weeks of reserves football, Tuck made a return to AFL football for the later part of the season before announcing he would retire at season's end.

Tuck featured in the club's first finals match in 12 years when Richmond earned an elimination final berth against  in 2013. He was the substitute player for Richmond during that match but played almost the full match when brought on to replace Reece Conca after the latter suffered a hamstring injury just 10 minutes into the game.

Tuck retired following the 2013 season after 173 games over 10 seasons with Richmond.

AFL statistics

|- style="background-color: #EAEAEA"
! scope="row" style="text-align:center" | 2000
|
| 38 || 0 || — || — || — || — || — || — || — || — || — || — || — || — || — || —
|-
! scope="row" style="text-align:center" | 2001
|
| 38 || 0 || — || — || — || — || — || — || — || — || — || — || — || — || — || —
|- style="background-color: #EAEAEA"
! scope="row" style="text-align:center" | 2004
|
| 21 || 3 || 1 || 0 || 21 || 16 || 37 || 7 || 2 || 0.3 || 0.0 || 7.0 || 5.3 || 12.3 || 2.3 || 0.7
|-
! scope="row" style="text-align:center" | 2005
|
| 21 || 22 || 10 || 14 || 323 || 195 || 518 || 106 || 71 || 0.5 || 0.6 || 14.7 || 8.9 || 23.5 || 4.8 || 3.2
|- style="background-color: #EAEAEA"
! scope="row" style="text-align:center" | 2006
|
| 21 || 22 || 11 || 8 || 262 || 199 || 461 || 102 || 72 || 0.5 || 0.4 || 11.9 || 9.0 || 21.0 || 4.6 || 3.3
|-
! scope="row" style="text-align:center" | 2007
|
| 21 || 22 || 12 || 6 || 253 || 237 || 490 || 114 || 61 || 0.5 || 0.3 || 11.5 || 10.8 || 22.3 || 5.2 || 2.8
|- style="background-color: #EAEAEA"
! scope="row" style="text-align:center" | 2008
|
| 21 || 22 || 10 || 1 || 229 || 318 || 547 || 102 || 84 || 0.5 || 0.0 || 10.4 || 14.5 || 24.9 || 4.6 || 3.8
|-
! scope="row" style="text-align:center" | 2009
|
| 21 || 19 || 8 || 3 || 213 || 310 || 523 || 90 || 62 || 0.4 || 0.2 || 11.2 || 16.3 || 27.5 || 4.7 || 3.3
|- style="background-color: #EAEAEA"
! scope="row" style="text-align:center" | 2010
|
| 21 || 20 || 5 || 5 || 227 || 283 || 510 || 91 || 103 || 0.3 || 0.3 || 11.4 || 14.2 || 25.5 || 4.6 || 5.2
|-
! scope="row" style="text-align:center" | 2011
|
| 21 || 10 || 1 || 2 || 85 || 110 || 195 || 31 || 36 || 0.1 || 0.2 || 8.5 || 11.0 || 19.5 || 3.1 || 3.6
|- style="background-color: #EAEAEA"
! scope="row" style="text-align:center" | 2012
|
| 21 || 22 || 11 || 11 || 266 || 310 || 576 || 117 || 124 || 0.5 || 0.5 || 12.1 || 14.1 || 26.2 || 5.3 || 5.6
|-
! scope="row" style="text-align:center" | 2013
|
| 21 || 11 || 5 || 6 || 95 || 94 || 189 || 22 || 24 || 0.5 || 0.5 || 8.6 || 8.5 || 17.2 || 2.0 || 2.2
|- class="sortbottom"
! colspan=3| Career
! 173
! 74
! 56
! 1974
! 2072
! 4046
! 782
! 639
! 0.4
! 0.3
! 11.4
! 12.0
! 23.4
! 4.5
! 3.7
|}

Honours and achievements
 Jack Titus Medal (2nd place, Richmond B&F): 2008
 2× Maurie Fleming Medal (3rd place, Richmond B&F): 2005, 2007
 Fred Swift Medal (4th RFC B&F): 2012
 Kevin Bartlett Medal (5th place, Richmond B&F): 2010
 Richmond life membership, awarded 2012

Post-AFL life
In 2014, Tuck played local football for the Goodwood Saints Football Club in the South Australian Amateur Football League (SAAFL).

Tuck debuted in professional boxing in November 2015 at the Melbourne Convention and Exhibition Centre, being knocked out in the fourth round from an uppercut to the chin by Lucas Miller; he was carried out on a stretcher. He fought in five professional matches over a boxing career that lasted until August 2017, winning three, losing once and drawing on one other occasion.

Personal life
Shane was the son of  footballer and former-VFL/AFL games record holder Michael Tuck and older brother of former  footballer Travis Tuck. He was the nephew of  great Gary Ablett Sr and former VFL footballers Geoff and Kevin Ablett. He was cousin to Geelong and  players Gary Ablett Jr and Nathan Ablett. Tuck was married to wife Katherine and had two children, a boy and a girl.

Tuck committed suicide on 20 July 2020 at the age of 38. Richmond wore black armbands to honour his memory in their Round 8 match against  on 24 July 2020.

In January 2021, the Australian Sports Brain Bank stated that Tuck had suffered from a severe case of the degenerative brain disease chronic traumatic encephalopathy.

References

External links

 
 
 Shane Tuck's statistics from Footy Wire
 

1981 births
2020 deaths
West Adelaide Football Club players
Richmond Football Club players
Box Hill Football Club players
Place of death missing
Australian rules footballers from Victoria (Australia)
Dandenong Stingrays players
Coburg Football Club players
2020 suicides
Suicides in Australia
Sportspeople with chronic traumatic encephalopathy